Plimpton may refer to:

People
 Calvin Plimpton (1918–2007), American educator
 Charles Plimpton (1894–1948), English businessman
 George Plimpton (1927–2003), American journalist and actor
 Francis T. P. Plimpton (1900–1983), American diplomat and lawyer
 George Arthur Plimpton (1855–1936), American publisher and philanthropist
 James Leonard Plimpton (1828–1911), American inventor
 Job Plimpton (1784–1864), American composer
 Martha Plimpton (born 1970), American actress
 Shelley Plimpton (born 1947), American actress

Places
 Plimpton–Winter House, in Wrentham, Massachusetts
 Simon Plimpton Farmhouse, in Southbridge, Massachusetts

Other
 Debevoise & Plimpton, an American law firm
 Plimpton 322, a Babylonian clay tablet
 Plimpton Prize, an American literary award

See also
Plympton (disambiguation)

English-language surnames